The first season of Fresh Off the Boat, an American sitcom created by Nahnatchka Khan and produced by 20th Century Fox Television, premiered in the United States on ABC on February 4, 2015, and concluded on April 21, 2015. The season consisted of 13 episodes.

The series focuses on the life of a Taiwanese-American family in Florida in the 1990s. The first season stars Randall Park, Constance Wu, Hudson Yang, Forrest Wheeler and Ian Chen. With Lucille Soong, Chelsey Crisp and Ray Wise in supporting roles.

Cast and characters

Main 
 Randall Park as Louis Huang
 Constance Wu as Jessica Huang
 Hudson Yang as Edwyn "Eddie" Huang
 Forrest Wheeler as Emery Huang
 Ian Chen as Evan Huang,

Recurring 
 Lucille Soong as Jenny Huang
 Chelsey Crisp as Honey Ellis
 Ray Wise as Marvin Ellis
 Eddie Huang as himself (voice only)
 Trevor Larcom as Trent
 Evan Hannemann as Barefoot Dave
 Prophet Bolden as Walter
 Dash Williams as Brian
 Luna Blaise as Nicole
 Rachel Cannon as Dierdre
 Stacey Scowley as Carol-Joan
 Colleen Ryan as Amanda
 David Goldman as Principal Hunter
 Paul Scheer as Mitch
 Jillian Armenante as Nancy
 Noel Gugliemi (credited as Noel G.) as Hector Martinez

Episodes

Ratings

References 

2015 American television seasons